The Safir Office Machines Museum is a private museum located in Tehran, Iran. It was founded in 2008 by Frashad Kamalkhani, the museum owner. It includes a collection of early office machines.

Collection
There are more than 80 unique and early devices such as typewriters, check writers, pencil sharpeners, duplicators, calculators, cash registers, telegraph equipment, telephones, etc., in the collection.

See also
International rankings of Iran
Iranian Crown Jewels
Tehran Museum of Contemporary Art
The Carpet Museum of Iran
Iran Cultural Heritage Organization
Azarbaijan Museum

References

External links

Safir Office Machines Museum (in Persian)

Museums established in 2008
Museums in Tehran
Technology museums
Office equipment
2008 establishments in Iran